Guidepoint is an expert network, providing business & government professionals with opportunities to communicate with industry and subject-matter experts to answer hard (or impossible) research questions. Guidepoint clients consult with these experts over the phone, in-person at conferences, at teleconferences, at custom events and workshops, or may gather their primary research data through surveys, polls, or web-based data offerings.

Guidepoint is based in New York City and has additional offices around the world, including Phoenix, Boston, San Francisco, London, Düsseldorf, Athens, Singapore, Hong Kong, Shanghai, Seoul, Tokyo, Dubai, Sydney, and Mumbai.

History 
Guidepoint was founded by Albert Sebag, previously a bioorganic chemist, where he helped to develop anti-estrogen drugs for treatment of certain cancers. Sebag then moved on to law, earning his J.D. from Boston College Law School. During his legal career, he focused on intellectual property and biotechnology litigation for generic pharmaceutical clients. This experience eventually led Sebag to begin a matching service for oncology patients called Clinical Advisors. Launched in 2003, Clinical Advisors matched cancer patients with the clinical trial that best suited their case.

As Clinical Advisors expanded their network to include expertise in additional healthcare areas, the company progressed into other industries and sectors. In 2007, the company changed its name to Guidepoint Global to reflect this expanded business model. In 2009, Guidepoint Global acquired Vista Research from Standard & Poor’s, a subsidiary of the company formerly called The McGraw-Hill Companies, an expert network company that was active in Asia and had a strong network of experts in other industries such as technology and telecom.

Shortly after rebranding as Guidepoint, “the experts at finding expertise,” and premiering a new logo and website, Guidepoint acquired Innosquared, a Germany-based expert network firm.”

Business model 
Clients use Guidepoint as a resource to find answers to specific industry questions that might only be answered by industry and subject-matter experts. The company essentially operates as a matchmaking service, connecting its users to recruited experts in the field they are looking to learn more about. Experts are categorized into six main industry sectors: Healthcare; Financial and Business Services; Consumer Goods and Services; Energy, Industrials, Basic Materials; Tech, Media, and Telecom; and Legal and Regulatory.

Services are subscription-based and include hourly phone consultations, in-person events, teleconferences, surveys, custom research reports, and a monthly healthcare data offering called Guidepoint TRACKER, which features data on market share in the therapeutics and medical device sectors, such as the US Breast Implant market.

According to Integrity Research, Guidepoint is ranked as the second-largest expert network, with a network of more than 1,000,000 experts.

Compliance 
In 2011, Guidepoint hired Catherine Smith, a former senior counsel at the U.S. Securities and Exchange Commission (SEC), to head Guidepoint’s Legal and Compliance departments.

Regulatory issue with insider trading 
In 2010, there were allegations that an expert who provided expert network services gave confidential information to a third party who traded on that information in violation of the federal securities law. That resulted in a strong regulatory focus on the industry and its investment firm clients. Charges were not brought against Guidepoint. According to Integrity Research, “Although Guidepoint was mentioned in insider trading complaints, its compliance procedures protected it from accusations of wrong doing.”

Philanthropy 
Guidepoint donates to and sponsors a number of charitable causes, including Teach for America, Harlem RBI, New York Cares, City Harvest, and the United Way of America.

Guidepoint founder and CEO Albert Sebag is a board member for service organization Repair the World.

References 

Business intelligence organizations
Companies based in New York City
Privately held companies based in New York (state)
Research and analysis firms of the United States
Knowledge markets
Consulting firms established in 2003